Ernst Huber (15 July 1895 – 26 September 1960) was an Austrian painter. His work was part of the painting event in the art competition at the 1928 Summer Olympics.

References

1895 births
1960 deaths
20th-century Austrian painters
Austrian male painters
Olympic competitors in art competitions
Artists from Vienna
20th-century Austrian male artists